The 2020 Nobel Prize in Physiology or Medicine was awarded to the American virologists Harvey J. Alter (b. 1935), Michael Houghton (b. 1949) and Charles M. Rice (b. 1952) "for the discovery of Hepatitis C virus." During the award ceremony on December 10, 2020, Prof. Gunilla Karlsson-Hedestam said:

Laureates

Harvey J. Alter

Alter was born in New York City in a Jewish family. He attended the University of Rochester in Rochester, New York, and earned a Bachelor of Arts degree in 1956. In 1960, Alter obtained a medical degree from University of Rochester and began a residency at Strong Memorial. Alters's post graduate training includes a rotation as a clinical associate at the National Institutes of Health in Bethesda, Maryland, from December 1961 to June 1964; a year of residency in medicine at University of Washington School of Medicine, Seattle, Washington, from July 1964 to June 1965; and work as a hematology fellow at Georgetown University Hospital, Washington, D.C., from July 1965 to June 1966. He has been senior investigator in the Department of Transfusion Medicine at the NIH from July 1969 to present; chief of infectious diseases section at the department of transfusion medicine in the Clinical Center NIH from December 1972 to present; associate director for research at the department of transfusion medicine at the Clinical Center at NIH from January 1987 to present. He was the recipient of 1992 Karl Landsteiner Memorial Award, the 2002 Lasker-DeBakey Clinical Medical Research Award or his work leading to the discovery of the virus that causes hepatitis C, and 2013 Gairdner Foundation International Award.

Michael Houghton

Michael James Houghton was born in 1929 in the United Kingdom. He received his Ph.D. degree in biochemistry in 1977 from King's College London. He joined the G. D. Searle & Company before moving in 1982 to Chiron Corporation in California. He relocated to the University of Alberta in 2010 and is currently a professor of virology at the University of Alberta where he is also director of the Li Ka Shing Applied Virology Institute. He was a recipient of numerous prizes such as 1992 Karl Landsteiner Memorial Award (together with Harvey J. Alter), the 1994 William Beaumont Prize, and the 2002 Lasker Award.

Charles M. Rice

Charles Moen Rice was born in 1952 in Sacramento, California. He received his Ph.D. degree in 1981 from the California Institute of Technology where he also trained as a postdoctoral fellow between 1981–1985. He established his research group at Washington University School of Medicine in 1986 and became a full professor in 1995. Since 2001, he has been professor at the Rockefeller University in New York. During 2001–2018, he was the Scientific and Executive Director at the Center for the Study of Hepatitis C at Rockefeller University where he remains active. He was the recipient of the 2007 M.W. Beijerinck Virology Prize, the 2015 Robert Koch Prize, and the 2016 Lasker Award (with Michael J. Sofia and Ralf F. W. Bartenschlager).

Key publications
The following publications were the fundamental researches that motivated the Nobel Assembly at Karolinska Institutet to award the 2020 Prize to Alter, Houghton and Rice:

Harvey J. Alter
 Alter H.J., Holland P.V., Purcell R.H., Lander J.J., Feinstone S.M., Morrow A.G., Schmidt P.J. Posttransfusion hepatitis after exclusion of commercial and hepatitis-B antigen-positive donors. Ann Intern Med. 1972; 77:691-699.
 Feinstone S.M., Kapikian A.Z., Purcell R.H., Alter H.J., Holland P.V. Transfusion-associated hepatitis not due to viral hepatitis type A or B. N Engl J Med. 1975; 292:767-770.
 Alter H.J., Holland P.V., Morrow A.G., Purcell R.H., Feinstone S.M., Moritsugu Y. Clinical and serological analysis of transfusion-associated hepatitis. Lancet. 1975; 2:838-841.
 Alter H.J., Purcell R.H., Holland P.V., Popper H. Transmissible agent in non-A, non-B hepatitis. Lancet. 1978; 1:459-463.

Michael Houghton
 Choo Q.L., Kuo G., Weiner A.J., Overby L.R., Bradley D.W., Houghton M. Isolation of a cDNA clone derived from a blood-borne non-A, non-B viral hepatitis genome. Science. 1989; 244:359-362.

Charles M. Rice
 Kolykhalov A.A., Agapov E.V., Blight K.J., Mihalik K., Feinstone S.M., Rice C.M. Transmission of hepatitis C by intrahepatic inoculation with transcribed RNA. Science. 1997; 277:570-574.

Collaborative work
 Kuo G., Choo Q.L., Alter H.J., Gitnick G.L., Redeker A.G., Purcell R.H., Miyamura T., Dienstag J.L., Alter C.E., Stevens C.E., Tegtmeier G.E., Bonino F., Colombo M., Lee W.S., Kuo C., Berger K., Shuster J.R., Overby L.R., Bradley D.W., Houghton M. An essay for circulating antibodies to a major etiologic virus of human non-A, non-B hepatitis. Science. 1989; 244:362-364.

References

External links
Official website of the Nobel Foundation

2020
2020 awards